Multisensory learning is the assumption that individuals learn better if they are taught using more than one sense (modality). The senses usually employed in multisensory learning are visual, auditory, kinesthetic, and tactile – VAKT (i.e. seeing, hearing, doing, and touching). Other senses might include smell, taste and balance (e.g. making vegetable soup or riding a bicycle).

Multisensory learning is different from learning styles which is the assumption that people can be classified according to their learning style (audio, visual or kinesthetic). However, critics of learning styles say there is no consistent evidence that identifying an individual student's learning style and teaching for that style will produce better outcomes. Consequently, learning styles has not received widespread support from scientists, nor has it proven to be effective in the classroom. (For more on this see learning styles.)

Reports suggest the human brain has evolved to process multisensory signals, making it more natural than unisensory processing. Recent research has made clear that multisensory processing of information is part of daily life, whereby the brain integrates the information from different modalities (senses) into a coherent mental perception.

Some studies conclude that the benefits of multisensory learning are greatest if the senses are engaged concurrently (see Multisensory integration) and the instruction is direct (explicit) and systematic (see ). However, some neurologists question whether more is "actually better for learners who are struggling". The rational is that learners with developmental disorders may have impairments in cognitive control, planning and attention, so multisensory integration might place additional demands on systems that are already straining. Consequentially, it is suggested, it may be better to narrow the alternatives to one that works. Other studies suggest that multisensory integration only develops optimally by middle childhood (i.e. eight years of age or older).

According to the U.K. Independent review of the teaching of early reading (Rose Report 2006) multisensory learning is also effective because it keeps students more engaged in their learning. In 2010 the U.K. Department for Education established the core criteria for programs that teach school children to read by using systematic Synthetic phonics. It includes a requirement that the material "uses a multi-sensory approach so that children learn variously from simultaneous visual, auditory and kinaesthetic activities which are designed to secure essential phonic knowledge and skills".

The following organizations recommend multisensory instruction for learners with a learning disability: The International Dyslexia Association (IDA) and the National Institute of Child Health and Human Development (NICHHD). And one study says there is strong support for using multisensory experiences to increase the focus of students with special needs. One of the oldest proponents of multisensory phonics for remedial reading instruction is Orton-Gillingham, dating back to 1935. What Works Clearinghouse, a part of the Institute of Education Sciences reports there is a lack of studies meeting its strict evidence standards so it is "unable to draw any conclusions about the effectiveness or ineffectiveness of unbranded Orton-Gillingham–based strategies for students with learning disabilities". However, Best Evidence Encyclopedia, a part of Johns Hopkins School of Education found one qualifying study that showed an effect size of +0.43.

See also
 Cognitive psychology
 Crossmodal
 e-learning (theory)the cognitive science principles of effective multimedia learning using electronic educational technology
 Multimodality
 National Reading Panel
 Sensory processing
 Sensory processing disorder

References 

Learning
Senses